Tremoana Damm (born 1945) is a former international lawn bowler from the Cook Islands.

Bowls career
Damm has represented the Cook Islands at three Commonwealth Games; in the fours at the 1994 Commonwealth Games, in the fours at the 1998 Commonwealth Games and in the singles at the 2002 Commonwealth Games.

She won a triples bronze medal (with Porea Elisa and Tanimetua Harry) at the 1995 Asia Pacific Bowls Championships.

References

1945 births
Living people
Bowls players at the 1994 Commonwealth Games
Bowls players at the 1998 Commonwealth Games
Bowls players at the 2002 Commonwealth Games
Cook Island female bowls players